The Dead Daisies is the eponymous debut album by the international rock supergroup The Dead Daisies, featuring vocalist Jon Stevens and guitar player David Lowy. The album was produced by John Fields.

The album was released on August 9, 2013, and its lead single "Lock 'n' Load", featuring Slash, on April 19. It was also a bonus CD on the issue 191 of the UK music magazine Classic Rock.

Track listing

Personnel
All credits adapted from the original release.
Musicians
 Jon Stevens – vocals, guitar, acoustic guitar and producer on "Lock 'n' Load"
 David Lowy – guitar
 John Fields – bass, guitar, keyboards, percussion, organ on "Lock 'n' Load", producer, engineer, mixing
 Kevin Savigar – keyboards
 Dorian Crozier – drums
 Isaac Carpenter – drums on "Yesterday" and "Tomorrow"
 Vanessa Amorosi – vocals
 Slash – lead guitar on "Lock 'n' Load"
 Simon Hosford – bass, electric and acoustic guitar, engineer on "Lock 'n' Load"
 Johnny Salerno – drums on "Lock 'n' Load"

Production
Aaron Dobos, C. Todd Nielsen – assistant engineers
Paul David Hager – mixing
Howie Weinberg – mastering

References

External links
 
 

2013 debut albums
The Dead Daisies albums
Albums produced by John Fields (record producer)